Yellow bells is a common name for several plants and can refer to:

 Fritillaria pudica (yellow fritillary), a herbaceous plant
 Tecoma stans (yellow trumpetbush), a shrub